Azar Majedi is an Iranian communist activist, writer, chairperson of the Organization for Women's Liberation and one of the leaders of the Worker-Communist Party of Iran. She has been an opponent of the current regime ruling Iran since returning from her education abroad to oppose the regime in 1978, a movement she has described as 'just'.

Majedi was born in Iran to an atheist father and Muslim mother.

Political views
Majedi describes herself as a Marxist and Worker-communist. An atheist from the age of 12, she has described Islam as "a very misogynist ideology". In another interview Majedi expressed the view that although racism towards Muslims is ripe and real, 'Islamophobia' is "an invented concept trying to silence the world to criticize Islam or Islamic movement".

Personal life
Majedi was married to Mansoor Hekmat. Together they have three children.

References

External links
 Azar Majedi on Twitter
 Worker-Communist Unity Party of Iran
 Radio For A Better World
 Against Sexual Apartheid in Iran Interview with Azar Majedi

Iranian activists
Iranian women's rights activists
Iranian women activists
Exiles of the Iranian Revolution in the United Kingdom
Year of birth missing (living people)
Living people
Iranian emigrants to the United Kingdom
Worker-communist Party of Iran politicians
21st-century Iranian women politicians
21st-century Iranian politicians
Worker-communism Unity Party of Iran politicians
Iranian communists
Iranian dissidents
20th-century Iranian women politicians
20th-century Iranian politicians